Lepidocolaptes is a genus of birds in the ovenbird family Furnariidae. These are relatively small woodcreepers (subfamily Dendrocolaptinae) with fairly long, thin and slightly decurved bills.

Taxonomy
The genus Lepidocolaptes was introduced in 1853 by the German naturalist Ludwig Reichenbach. The name combines the Ancient Greek lepis meaning "scale" with kolaptēs meaning "pecker". The type species was designated as the scaled woodcreeper by George Robert Gray in 1855.

Species
The genus contains 11 species:

The lesser woodcreeper was formerly included in this genus, but is now in Xiphorhynchus.

References

 
Bird genera
Taxonomy articles created by Polbot
Taxa named by Ludwig Reichenbach